12 Soulful Nights of Christmas is a compilation of Christmas songs released on December 3, 1996, through So So Def Recordings. In 1998, the album was reissued with two new songs.

Track listing
"The Time of Year" (Kenny Lattimore) — 4:47
"Christmas Without You" (Xscape) — 4:07
"In Love at Christmas" (K-Ci & JoJo) — 3:57
"Little Drummer Girl" (Alicia Keys) — 4:32
"Someday at Christmas" (Voices of Soul) — 4:42
"Christmas Only Once a Year" (Chaka Khan) — 3:56
"A Christmas Lullabye" (Faith Evans) — 2:10
"Because of His Love" (Brian McKnight) — 4:05
"The Christmas Song" (Tamia) — 5:06
"Christmas Without My Girl" (Gerald Levert) — 4:29
"Not Really Christmas" (Trina Broussard) — 4:54
"My Younger Days" (Trey Lorenz) — 4:33
"Every Day Should Be Christmas" (NeeNa Lee) — 4:08
"This Christmas" (Jagged Edge) — 5:07

References

1996 Christmas albums
Albums produced by Jermaine Dupri
Christmas compilation albums
Contemporary R&B Christmas albums
Contemporary R&B compilation albums
So So Def Recordings compilation albums
Hip hop compilation albums
Columbia Records compilation albums
1996 compilation albums